Micro.blog is a microblogging and social networking service created by Manton Reece.
It is the first large multi-user social media service to support the Webmention and Micropub standards published by the World Wide Web Consortium, and is part of the Fediverse, supporting ActivityPub.

History 
Micro.blog has features similar to Twitter or Instagram, and provides for posting status updates, articles, photos, short podcasts, and video. Micro.blog also supports long-form blogging.

It was launched on April 24, 2017, after a Kickstarter campaign that reached its funding target within one day. The service 
was built using Jekyll, but later transitioned to Hugo. Users can post using hosted accounts or import RSS feeds from other self-hosted blogs to syndicate them into the network from other websites they run. Users can also import their posts from Twitter, WordPress, Tumblr, and the defunct microblogging service App.net.
Some of the Kickstarter Campaign rewards involved access to a book on Indie Microblogging that Reece committed to writing. A full draft of this now exists  (as of 2022-12-22) and is publicly available.

The web hosting service DreamHost supported Micro.blog's Kickstarter campaign, and announced their intent to help customers create independent microblogs hosted at DreamHost that are compatible with Micro.blog.

Philosophy 

Micro.blog encourages users to publish under their own domain as part of its
support for the IndieWeb "POSSE" principles—Publish (on your) Own Site, Syndicate Elsewhere. This publishing model involves the end user posting content to their own domain name based site first, then using web standards to syndicate to multiple other social networks and platforms.

Micro.blog supports syndication to Facebook Pages, as well as to Twitter, Facebook, Medium, LinkedIn, Mastodon, and Tumblr accounts. It also supports importing from data exported from WordPress, and supports cross-posting from Instagram to micro.blog.

Micro.blog eschews many of
the common features of Twitter and other Microblogging platforms.
For example, Micro.blog does not show
follower counts, does not have
hashtags,

public likes

or trending topics,
does not have equivalents of
retweeting

or quote tweeting,
does not algorithmically recommend users and like
Mastodon, and does not have full-text search
as part of the service 
or client apps. Reece says in his book:
"It mirrors a philosophy we have with Micro.blog to launch without follower
counts or public likes."

Unusually, for a social network, Micro.blog's first full time employee
was a Community Manager,
Jean Macdonald,
who—among other things—produces a hand-curated "Discover" section on
Micro.blog.

Reece explains some of this in his book, saying:
"I think more social networks should do things that don’t scale,
prioritizing safety over profit. For example, in Micro.blog the
featured posts in Discover are curated by humans instead of
algorithms."

He also writes:
 Micro.blog doesn’t make it particularly easy to discover new users,
 and posts don’t spread virally. While some might view this as a
 weakness, and it does mean we grow more slowly than other social
 networks, this is by design. No retweets, no trending hashtags, no
 unlimited global search, and no algorithmic recommended users.

 Micro.blog limits search and avoids public likes and reposts so
 that the snowball starts small and stays small. Instead of going
 viral and becoming a major problem, fake accounts can be spotted
 early and shut down if
 necessary.

Client applications 
 Wavelength
 Sunlit 2.0
 Icro 1.0
 Gluon

See also 
 IndieWeb
 Microblogging

References

External links 
 

Microblogging software
Blog hosting services
Internet properties established in 2017